The 1994 Florida Gators football team represented the University of Florida during the 1994 NCAA Division I-A football season. The season was Steve Spurrier's fifth as the head coach of the Florida Gators football team.  Spurrier's 1994 Florida Gators posted an overall record of 10–2–1 and a 6–1 record in the Southeastern Conference (SEC), placing first among the six SEC Eastern Division teams and winning the SEC championship.

Before the season
The Gators were eyeing a national title.

Schedule

Primary source: 2015 Florida Gators Football Media Guide.

Roster

Rankings

Season summary

New Mexico State

Terry Dean tied an NCAA record by throwing for seven touchdowns in the first half.

Kentucky

E. Williams 13 Rush, 115 Yds

Tennessee

Ole Miss

LSU

Auburn

Georgia

Southern Mississippi

South Carolina

Vanderbilt

Florida State

SEC Championship

Florida State (Sugar Bowl)

Postseason
The Seminoles then won a rematch in the Sugar Bowl, 23–17, referred to as "The Fifth Quarter in the French Quarter."

References

Florida
Florida Gators football seasons
Southeastern Conference football champion seasons
Florida Gators football